Ronald Herman Witmeyer (born June 28, 1967) is an American former first baseman in Major League Baseball who played for the Oakland Athletics during their 1991 season. Listed at  6' 3", 215 lb., he batted and threw left handed.

Born in West Islip, New York, Witmeyer attended Stanford University, and in 1986 he played collegiate summer baseball with the Harwich Mariners of the Cape Cod Baseball League.

He was selected by the Athletics in the 7th round of the 1988 MLB Draft. In 11 games, he hit one single in 19 at-bats and did not score or drive in a run.

References

External links
, or Retrosheet
Venezuelan Winter League

1967 births
Living people
Amarillo Dillas players
Baseball players from New York (state)
Harwich Mariners players
Huntsville Stars players
Major League Baseball first basemen
Modesto A's players
Navegantes del Magallanes players
American expatriate baseball players in Venezuela
Oakland Athletics players
People from West Islip, New York
Stanford Cardinal baseball players
Tacoma Tigers players
Sportspeople from Suffolk County, New York